Product For Mass Consumption was a 1997 single release by the band Servotron. It was the only split single that Servotron appeared on. The B-side track is performed by Revo, who later changed their name to Operation Re-Information (ORI). It was released on clear vinyl and black vinyl.

Track listing 
Side A: Servotron: "Index of the SRA"
Side B: Revo: "Corporate Takeover"

Line Up
Sevotron - Trustees of the Machine:
Z4-OBX
Proto Unit V3
00ZX1
Gammatron

Revo administered by:
Administrator of Information Reassembly, Professor Swank
Administrator of Information Reassembly, Agent TripleX
Administrator of Information Reassembly, Dr. Spectt
Administrator of Information Reassembly, Dr. Spanglestein

References

Servotron albums
1997 EPs